The leatherjacket fish (Oligoplites  saurus), also known as leather jack, is a species of jack in the family Carangidae. Leather jack may also refer to other members of the Carangidae, such as the pilot fish. The largest are about a foot long.

Distribution
There are two subspecies of Oligoplites saurus. The nominate subspecies O.s. saurus is distributed in the western Atlantic Ocean from Chatham, Massachusetts south along the U.S. coast, throughout the Gulf of Mexico and Caribbean Sea, and along the South American coast to Rio Grande do Sul, Brazil. The other subspecies O. s. inornatus is found in the eastern Pacific Ocean from southern Baja California, much of the Gulf of California to Ecuador, including the Galapagos and Malpelo Islands.

Feeding
It voraciously devours small fish and shrimp, often in company with larger predatory species. Leatherjackets feed on small fish including the silver perch.

As food
Traditionally, the leather jacket has not been eaten, but recently, with large-scale farming of the fish, it has become common at market. The fish has a mild, oily taste similar to Spanish mackerel or bluefish. 

It has occasionally been the prey to blue swimmer crab, as juvenile fish in sea grass beds.

References

External links
 Fish and Wildlife Service
 Smithsonian Marine Station
 FishBase

leatherjacket fish
Fish of the Western Atlantic
Fish of Mexican Pacific coast
Western Central American coastal fauna
leatherjacket fish